Marije Smits (born 24 October 1986) is a Dutch amputee and Paralympian named "2011 Paralympic Athlete of the Year" by the Dutch Athletics Union. She competed at the Netherlands at the 2012 Summer Paralympics and she did not win a medal.

References

External links 
Personal website (Dutch)
Profile at Atletiekunie.nl
Profile sponsored by Asics

Athletes (track and field) at the 2004 Summer Paralympics
Athletes (track and field) at the 2008 Summer Paralympics
Athletes (track and field) at the 2012 Summer Paralympics
Paralympic athletes of the Netherlands
Dutch amputees
1986 births
Sportspeople from Gouda, South Holland
Living people
Dutch female sprinters
Dutch female long jumpers
Sprinters with limb difference
Long jumpers with limb difference
Paralympic sprinters
Paralympic long jumpers
21st-century Dutch women